Heuberger (Yiddish: הויבערגר; Hebrew: הויברגר) is a topographic surname of German and Ashkenazi Jewish origin, deriving from the region of Heuberg in Suebia. It is composed of the Middle High German "höu" (trans. hay) and "berg" (trans. mountain) meaning "hay mountain". Notable people with the surname Heuberger include:
Georg Heuberger (1946–2010), German historian
Ivo Heuberger (born 1976), Swiss tennis player
Martin Heuberger (born 1964), German handball player
Rami Heuberger (born 1963), Israeli actor
Renat Heuberger (born 1976), Swiss businessman
Richard Heuberger (1850–1914), Austrian composer
Robert Heuberger (born 1922), Swiss businessman

See also 
82232 Heuberger, main-belt asteroid named after Robert Heuberger.

References 

German-language surnames
Jewish surnames